Spilosoma semialbescens is a moth in the family Erebidae. It was described by George Talbot in 1929. It is found on Seram Island in Indonesia.

References

Moths described in 1929
semialbescens